The Fred Rust Ice Arena or University of Delaware Ice Arena multi-purpose arena located on the campus of The University of Delaware located in Newark, Delaware. The Facility houses two ice sheets. The first sheet is located in the Fred Rust Arena and the second sheet is located in the Gold Arena which is a separate building. The Fred Rust Ice Arena, is a 2,500-seat regulation Olympic-sized ice arena on the UD campus. The Fred Rust Ice Arena, originally named The Blue Arena, was built in 1988 and houses the Olympic-sized ice area, a VIP lounge, a pro shop, locker rooms, weight and fitness facility, ballet room, off-ice spinner and a concession area. The Gold Arena is the NHL-sized ice sheet and was constructed in 1971. The Gold arena sits adjacent to the Fred Rust on the UD campus. 

The facility is home to the Delaware Fightin' Blue Hens men's and women's ice hockey teams competing. The men's team competes at the ACHA Division I level in the Eastern States Collegiate Hockey League; while the women's team competes at ACHA Women's Division II level in the Delaware Valley Collegiate Hockey Conference. It is also home of the University of Delaware Figure Skating Club and University of Delaware Synchronized Skating Club

The Ice Arena is also used for recreational sports by UD students and local public, as well as various local youth hockey programs, recreational and competitive figure skating.

Ice Skating Science Development Center
The University of Delaware Ice Skating Science Development Center (ISSDC) is one of the world's leading training and research sites for the sport of figure skating. It uses the Fred Rust Ice Arena and the Gold Ice Arena, as well as strength and aerobic training rooms and dance studio. UD faculty have collaborated with the World and Olympic coaches to advance the body of knowledge in figure skating, and encompasses research areas of: sports medicine, exercise physiology, biomechanics and sports psychology.

References

External links
 University of Delaware Ice Arena
 UD Hockey
 UD Figure Skating
 UD Synchronized Skating

Sports venues in Delaware
College ice hockey venues in the United States
Indoor ice hockey venues in the United States
Sports venues completed in 1971
1971 establishments in Delaware
Indoor arenas in Delaware